Kariankode River is a major river in Kasaragod district of Kerala state, India. Kariangode river is the second largest river in Kasaragod district. It is running through the hills and dales of Vellarikundu, Hosdurg and Payyanur Taluks. Kariangode River also known as Tejaswani River is one among the 44 rivers flowing through Kerala state. Places like Pulingome, Cherupuzha, Kakkadavu, Kayyur and Karindalam are situated at bank of this river.

Origin
Kariangode River originates from Coorg Hills in the reserve forest of Coorg in the state of Karnataka.

Tributaries
Chaithravahini River and Pulingom River are the two tributaries of Kariangode River.

Bridges on Kariangode River
There are many bridges over Kariangode River. The main bridges include Pulingome bridge, Cherupuzha Bridge, Kollada bridge, Kakadavu bridge, Mukkada bridge, Arayakadav bridge, Kariangode bridge and Kottapuram bridge. The longest is Kottapuram Bridge.

References

Rivers of Kasaragod district